According to the Coal Association of Canada, there are 24 permitted coal mines throughout Canada, 19 of which currently operate. The vast majority of the country's coal deposits can be found in British Columbia, Alberta, Saskatchewan and Nova Scotia.

Alberta
Mining operations in Alberta produce lower and higher ranked coal. Low-ranked coals include subbituminous coal, brown coal, and lignite; high-ranked coals include bituminous coal and anthracite or hard coals.

British Columbia

Nova Scotia

Nunavut

Saskatchewan

Yukon

See also

 Coal in Alberta
 Coal in Canada

Notes

References

 
 Coal
Canada